Plagiodontes dentatus is a recent species of small to medium-sized air-breathing land snail, terrestrial pulmonate gastropods in the family Orthalicidae, subfamily Odontostominae. It occurs in Entre Ríos Province, Argentina.

Fossil record
Plagiodontes dentatus has a fossil record extending back to the Brazilian Paleocene, with a supposed specimen belonging to this species found in the limestones of Itaboraí Basin. It has also been recorded from the Miocene of Uruguay and Miocene and Pleistocene of Argentina.

References 

Odontostomidae
Fossil taxa described in 1828